Pyrrhula is a small genus of passerine birds, commonly called bullfinches, belonging to the finch family (Fringillidae). The genus has a Palearctic distribution; almost all species occur in Asia, with two species exclusively in the Himalayas and one species, P. pyrrhula, also occurring in Europe. The Azores bullfinch (P. murina) is a critically endangered species (about 120 pairs remaining), occurring only in the east of the island of São Miguel in the Azores archipelago.

Analysis of the mtDNA cytochrome b sequence indicates that the Holarctic pine grosbeak (Pinicola enucleator) is the closest living relative of this genus. Arguably, it could be included in Pyrrhula, but more probably is a distinct offshoot of a common ancestor, with the pine grosbeak as the sister group to the ancestor of the bullfinches. The evolution of the bullfinch species started soon after the pine grosbeak's ancestors diverged from them (at the end of the Middle Miocene, about 12 mya), and it is quite possible that the latter species evolved in North America; what is fairly certain is that the bullfinch radiation started in the general area of the Himalayas. The mountain finches also seem to be part of this clade.

Bullfinches have glossy black wings and tail feathers. They show a white rump. The legs and feet are fleshy brown. Their short, swollen bill is adapted to eat buds, and is black except for the brown bullfinch, which has a grey or greenish-grey bill. The males can be distinguished by their orange or red breast. Some species have a black cap.

Taxonomy

The genus Pyrrhula was introduced in 1760 by the French zoologist Mathurin Jacques Brisson. The name was derived by tautonymy from the binomial name of the Eurasian bullfinch Loxia pyrrhula introduced by Linnaeus in 1758.

The bullfinches in the genus Pyrrhula are sister to the pine grosbeak, the only species placed in the genus Pinicola.

Species 

There are eight extant and one extinct recognized species in the genus:

 †Greater Azores bullfinch Pyrrhula crassa

References 

 
Bird genera
Palearctic fauna